Belgorod State Technological University named after V.G. Shukhov (BSTU) (Russian: Белгородский государственный технологический университет им. В. Г. Шухова) is a technological university based in Belgorod, Russia. It specializes in the field of the construction materials. It trains experts for the construction industry and for many other fields.

History 

University was found as Belgorod Technological Institute of Building Materials according to Decision of USSR Council Minister dated by April 29, 1954 № 797 and according to order of high and specialized secondary education Department USSR dated by June 15, 1970 № 419. Belgorod Technological Institute of Building Materials was renamed in Belgorod State Technological Academy of Building Materials according to State Committee of High Education RF dated by April 29, 1994 № 355.
Belgorod State Technological Academy of Building Materials was renamed in State Educational Establishment of high Professional Education«Belgorod State Technological University named after V. G. Shoukhov» according to Ministry of Education RF dated by March 27, 2003 № 1249.

BSTU is one of the few russian universities which has campus. The area of 35 hectares includes academic and laboratory buildings, experimental and production facilities, science and research library, halls of residence, residential estate for the academic staff and employees, catering facilities, students art centre, sport facilities.

International cooperation 
By convention, the high-ranking guests from abroad plant trees on "Alley of friendship" ("Alleya Druzhby").
During celebration of the sixtieth anniversary in 2014, there were such guests as Ambassador of Sultanate of Oman in Russian Federation Yousef al-Zajali, Ambassador of State of Palestine Faed Mustafa, Ambassador of Arab Republic of Egypt Mahmud Jamil Ahmad Eldeeb, Ambassador of Syrian Arab Republic in Russian Federation Dr. Riad Haddad, the chairman of society of the Russian-Lebanese Friendship Dr. Bashir Abas.

BSTU signed the contract on cooperation in educational and scientific activity with Tianjin Foreign Studies University on October 24, 2014.

University in rankings 
BSTU named after Shukhov was ranked 55 in the list of best universities of CIS by rating agency RAEX.

The university also was ranked 50 in «ARES-2014» rating.

Faculties 

     Institute of Architecture and Construction
     Institute of construction materials science and environmental engineering
     Institute of Economics and Management
     Institute of Information Technologies and Operating Systems
     Institute of Technological equipment and machine building
     Transportation Technology Institute
     Power Engineering Institute
     Preparatory faculty for foreign students
     Institute of Distance Learning
     Institute of Correspondence Study

References

External links
  official website

Educational institutions established in 1954
Belgorod
Universities in Russia
Buildings and structures in Belgorod Oblast
1954 establishments in the Soviet Union